Clarence O. Applegran (November 6, 1893 – May 6, 1960) was an American basketball coach.  He was the head coach of the Kentucky Wildcats men's basketball team of the University of Kentucky in 1924–1925, and compiled a 13–8 record.

Applegran attended the University of Illinois and played football and basketball.  During the 1919 season, Applegran earned All-American honors as a guard for the Fighting Illini football team.  He later played professional football for the Detroit Heralds for the 1920 season before beginning his coaching career.

Applegran, who served in World Wars I and II and rose to the rank of colonel, finished his career at South Shore High School in Chicago, Illinois. At the school, Applegran was known for a booming baritone voice that required no amplification during pep rallies held in the large auditorium.

References

External links
 

1893 births
1960 deaths
Military personnel from Chicago
American football guards
American men's basketball players
Forwards (basketball)
Allegheny Gators football coaches
Allegheny Gators men's basketball coaches
Detroit Heralds players
Illinois Fighting Illini football players
Illinois Fighting Illini men's basketball players
Kentucky Wildcats men's basketball coaches
Washington University Bears men's basketball coaches
High school basketball coaches in Illinois
High school football coaches in Illinois
United States Army personnel of World War I
Basketball coaches from Illinois
United States Army personnel of World War II
United States Army colonels
Basketball players from Chicago
Players of American football from Illinois